Montpelier railway station opened in 1895 and closed in 1992. It is on the list of designated National Heritage Sites in Jamaica.

Architecture
The station was constructed in 1895 of timber to a unique two-storey design in a combination of Jamaican Georgian and Victorian architectural styles. The ground floor is constructed of ashlar, the upper floor of timber. It has decorative fanlights, a Queen Ann entablature and pediment above the windows and a gable end zinc roof.

In 2003, it was reported as being in "very poor condition" and "in need of major repairs".

Fares
In 1910 the third class fare from Montpelier to Kingston was 8/- (eight shillings); first class was about double.

See also
Railway stations in Jamaica

References

External links
Aerial view.
Photo: .

Railway stations in Jamaica
Buildings and structures in Saint James Parish, Jamaica
Railway stations opened in 1895
Railway stations closed in 1992